The Junior Miss Stakes was an American flat Thoroughbred horse race for two-year-old fillies held annually at Del Mar Racetrack in Del Mar, California from 1952 through 1992.  It was run as a Grade III race over a distance of 6 furlongs on dirt.

Winners since 1970 
1992 - Best Dress
1991 - Soviet Sojourn
1990 - Cuddles
1989 - A Wild Ride
1988 - Executive Row
1987 - Sheesham
1986 - Footy
1985 - Wee Lavaliere
1984 - Doon's Baby
1983 - Yolanda
1982 - Some Kinda Flirt
1981 - Buy My Act
1980 - Sweet Amends
1979 - Hazel R.
1978 - Joi'ski
1977 - Illustrious Girl
1976 - Lullaby
1975 - Doc Shah's Siren
1974 - Miss Tokyo
1973 - Fleet Peach
1972 - Rosalie Mae Wynn
1971 - Chargerette
1970 - Conniving Princess

Del Mar Racetrack
Horse races in California
Discontinued horse races
Flat horse races for two-year-old fillies
Previously graded stakes races in the United States
Recurring sporting events established in 1952
1952 establishments in California
Recurring sporting events disestablished in 1992
1992 disestablishments in California